Medem is a surname. Notable people with that name include:

Christoph Johann von Medem (1763–1838), nobleman from Courland and courtier in the courts of Prussian kings
Dorothea von Medem (1761–1821), Countess, Duchess of Courland, popularly known as Dorothea of Courland
Friedrich Johann Graf von Medem (1912–1984), German-born zoologist who emigrated to Colombia, representative of the IUCN Crocodiles Specialist Group for South America
Julio Medem (born 1958), Spanish screenwriter and film director
Pavel Medem (1800–1854), Russian diplomat and privy councillor
Rudolph von Medem (1846–unknown), German-born soldier in the U.S. Army who served during the Indian Wars
Stephan Medem (born 1960), Swiss former professional tennis player
Vladimir Medem (1879–1923), Russian Jewish politician and ideologue of the Jewish Labour Bund, eponym of the Medem library